Dietopsa is a genus of Asian crab spiders that was first described by Embrik Strand in 1932.  it contains two species, found in India: D. castaneifrons and D. parnassia.

See also
 List of Thomisidae species

References

Further reading

Araneomorphae genera
Spiders of the Indian subcontinent
Taxa named by Embrik Strand
Thomisidae